NWDA may refer to:

 National Water Development Agency, India
 Northwest Regional Development Agency, England
 Northwest Digital Archives, USA